was a train station located in Inakadate, Aomori, Japan.

Lines 

Kōnan Railway Company
Kuroishi Line (Closed)

History 
The station was opened on April 15, 1935 and closed on April 1, 1998.

Adjacent stations 

Railway stations in Aomori Prefecture
Defunct railway stations in Japan
Railway stations in Japan opened in 1935
Railway stations closed in 1998